Domitila is a given name. Notable people with the name include:

Domitila Chúngara, Bolivian labor leader and feminist
Domitila, Marchioness of Santos, Brazilian noblewoman
Domitila García de Coronado, Cuban writer
Domitila de Carvalho, one of first three women members of the Portuguese parliament

See also
Domitila (1996), Nigerian film